William James Johnson may refer to:
 William Johnson (Australian politician) (1871–1916), Australian politician and soldier
 William James Johnson (Canadian politician) (1881–1949), member of the Legislative Assembly of British Columbia
 William Johnson (cricketer, born 1884) (1884–1941), Australian wine and spirit grocer and cricketer